The 2017 Kerry Senior Football Championship was the 116th edition of Kerry GAA's premier gaelic football tournament for senior teams in County Kerry, Ireland. The tournament consists of 17 teams (8 club teams and 9 divisional teams), with the winners representing Kerry in the Munster Senior Club Football Championship if they are a club team. If the winners are a divisional team the winners of the Kerry Club Football Championship represent the county.

The championship has a back-door format for the first two rounds before proceeding to a knock-out format. Generally, any team to lose two matches will be knocked out of the championship.

This was Kenmare Shamrocks return to the senior ranks, meaning they will no longer provide players to the Kenmare District panel for this season. Milltown/Castlemaine (who were relegated to the I.F.C. for 2017) will provide the Mid-Kerry Divisional side with players for the S.F.C.

Dr. Crokes were the defending champions after they defeated Kenmare District in the 2016 final.

Dr. Crokes won the 2017 senior club championship having defeated Kenmare Shamrocks 3-20 to 2-20 in the final in Fitzgerald Stadium after extra time on 10 September 2017.

Kilcummin were relegated to the 2018 I.F.C. after losing to Kerin's O'Rahillys in the Senior Club Championship Relegation Playoff. This ended their 20 year tenure as a senior club after claiming the 1997 Kerry I.F.C. title. This period involved a County final appearance in 2002 as well as Munster S.C.F.C. semi-final appearance in 2007.

Format Structure Change
8 club teams and 9 divisional teams (17 in total) will take part in this year's S.F.C. It was decided that only 8 divisional sides would take part in the competition proper so the 2 lowest ranked divisional sides from the previous 5 years would play off in a qualification match with the winner entering the draw for the 2017 County Championship proper.

Relegation (See below): The club team to be relegated from the Senior County Championship will be the same team to be relegated from the Senior Club Championship (The 8 senior clubs play off against each other in Round 1 of the Club Championship. The 4 losers enter a relegation playoff with the losers entering a relegation final. This loser will be relegated to the I.F.C. for 2017. Should a club reach the final of the County championship they will be exempt from the Relegation process in the Club championship).

The winner of the 2017 I.F.C. will be promoted to the 2018 Senior County and Club Championships.

Team Changes
The following teams have changed division since the 2016 championship season.

To S.F.C.
Promoted from 2016 Kerry Intermediate Football Championship
 Kenmare Shamrocks  -  (Intermediate Champions)

From S.F.C.
Relegated to 2017 Kerry I.F.C.
 Milltown/Castlemaine

Participating Teams
The teams taking part in the 2017 Kerry Senior Football Championship are:

Qualification

It was decided that only 8 of the 9 Divisional Teams would play in the Senior Championship. To determine which team would be excluded, all divisional teams were ranked on their performances in the County Championship over the most recent 5-year period (2012-2016 inclusive). These rankings were based on a win counting for 2 points and a draw counting for 1 point.

The 2 lowest placed sides were (as was the case in 2016) St. Brendan's and Shannon Rangers. These sides then meet in a qualifier to decide who would make it into the championship proper. The loser of this qualifier will play the lowest ranked team on completion of the 2017 Championship, to decide the 8 group teams for the 2018 Championship, except in the event of more than one team giving a walk over in this year’s Championship. In that case the teams that conceded walk-overs play in 2018 Championship Qualifier.

Rounds 1 to 3

Round 1

The Qualification winner and the remaining 15 teams play in eight matches. The winners proceed to Round 2A while the losers play in Round 2B.

Round 2

Round 2A
The 8 winners from Round 1 play each other in this round. The winners proceed to the quarter finals while the losers play in Round 3.

Round 2B
The 8 losers from Round 1 play  each other in this round. The winners proceed to Round 3 while the losers exit the championship.

Round 3
The four Round 2A losers play the four Round 2B winners in this round. The four winners progress to the quarter-finals while the losers exit the championship.

Knock-Out Stage

Quarter-finals

Semi-finals

Final

Relegation

The club team to be relegated from the Senior County Championship will be the same team to be relegated from the Senior Club Championship. The 8 senior clubs play off against each other in Round 1 of the Club Championship. The 4 losers enter a relegation playoff with the losers entering a relegation final. This loser will be relegated to the I.F.C. for 2018. Should a club reach the final of the County championship they will be exempt from the Relegation process in the Club championship.

Championship statistics

Miscellaneous

 Colm Copper brakes Paudie Sheehys record as he wins his 7th SFC medal.
 Dr Crokes go level with Austin Stacks at the top of the Roll of Honor with a 12th title.
 Kilcummin are relegated after 20 years as a senior club.

References

External links

Kerry Senior Football Championship
Kerry Senior Football Championship